Cabin in the Sky may refer to:

 Cabin in the Sky (musical), a 1940 musical
 Cabin in the Sky (film), a 1943 film
 Cabin in the Sky (Curtis Fuller album), 1962
 Cabin in the Sky (Tuxedomoon album), 2004